Type I cytokine receptors are transmembrane receptors expressed on the surface of cells that recognize and respond to cytokines with four α-helical strands.  These receptors are also known under the name hemopoietin receptors, and share a common amino acid motif (WSXWS) in the extracellular portion adjacent to the cell membrane.  Members of the type I cytokine receptor family comprise different chains, some of which are involved in ligand/cytokine interaction and others that are involved in signal transduction.

The common cytokine-binding domain is related to the Fibronectin type III domain.

Signal transduction chains
The signal transducing chains are often shared between different receptors within this receptor family.
 The IL-2 receptor common gamma chain (also known as CD132) is shared between:
 IL-2 receptor
 IL-4 receptor
 IL-7 receptor
 IL-9 receptor
 IL-13 receptor
 IL-15 receptor
 IL-21 receptor    
 The common beta chain (CD131 or CDw131) is shared between the following type I cytokine receptors:
 GM-CSF receptor
 IL-3 receptor
 IL-5 receptor.
 The gp130 receptor (Glycoprotein 130) (also known as gp130, IL6ST, IL6-beta or CD130) is shared between:
 IL-6 receptor
 IL-11 receptor
 IL-12 receptor
 IL-27 receptor
 Leukemia inhibitory factor receptor
 Oncostatin M receptor

Examples
Type I cytokine receptors include interleukin receptors, colony stimulating factor receptors and other cytokine receptors

Interleukin receptors

Colony stimulating factor receptors
 Erythropoietin receptor
 GM-CSF receptor
 G-CSF receptor
 Thrombopoietin receptor

Hormone receptor/neuropeptide receptor
 Growth hormone receptor
 Prolactin receptor
 Leptin receptor

Other
 Oncostatin M receptor
 Leukemia inhibitory factor receptor

References

External links
 

1
Type I cytokine receptors